Lars Christian Krogh Gerson (born 5 February 1990) is a Luxembourgish professional footballer who plays as a central defender for OBOS-ligaen side Kongsvinger IL.

International career
Krogh Gerson made his debut for Luxembourg in a 0–2 friendly loss against Wales. He did not fail to impress.

Krogh Gerson has also represented Luxembourg at youth level, a.o. at the under-17 European Championship of 2006.

Career statistics

Club

International 

Score lists Luxembourg's goal tally first.

Personal life
Krogh Gerson was born in Luxembourg to a Luxembourgian father and Norwegian mother. His maternal grandfather is the Norwegian anchorman Lars-Jacob Krogh.

References

External links
 

1990 births
Living people
Sportspeople from Luxembourg City
Luxembourgian people of Norwegian descent
Norwegian people of Luxembourgian descent
Luxembourgian footballers
Norwegian footballers
Association football midfielders
Norwegian First Division players
Eliteserien players
Kongsvinger IL Toppfotball players
Allsvenskan players
IFK Norrköping players
GIF Sundsvall players
Segunda División B players
Racing de Santander players
SK Brann players
Luxembourgian expatriate footballers
Norwegian expatriate footballers
Expatriate footballers in Sweden
Expatriate footballers in Spain
Luxembourgian expatriate sportspeople in Sweden
Luxembourgian expatriate sportspeople in Spain
Norwegian expatriate sportspeople in Sweden
Norwegian expatriate sportspeople in Spain
Luxembourg international footballers